The following is a list of the monastic houses in Rutland, England.

Listing

See also
 List of monastic houses in England

Notes

References

Medieval sites in England
Rutland
Rutland
Lists of buildings and structures in Rutland